Interdenominational marriage, sometimes called an inter-sect marriage or ecumenical marriage, is marriage between spouses professing a different denomination of same religion. 

Interdenominational marriages are distinguished from interfaith marriages, unions between two people of different religions.

Christianity 

In Christianity, an interdenominational marriage (also known as an ecumenical marriage) refers to a wedding between two baptized Christians who belong to different Christian denominations, for example a Christian marriage between a Lutheran Christian and a Catholic Christian.

In Methodism, ¶81 of the 2014 Book of Discipline of the Allegheny Wesleyan Methodist Connection, states with regard to interdenominational marriages: "We do not prohibit our people from marrying persons who are not of our connection, provided such persons have the form and are seeking the power of godliness; but we are determined to discourage their marrying persons who do not come up to this description."

The Catholic Church recognizes as sacramental, (1) the marriages between two baptized Protestants or between two baptized Orthodox Christians, as well as (2) marriages between baptized non-Catholic Christians and Catholic Christians, although in the latter case, consent from the diocesan bishop must be obtained, with this termed "permission to enter into a mixed marriage". To illustrate (1), for example, "if two Lutherans marry in the Lutheran Church in the presence of a Lutheran minister, the Catholic Church recognizes this as a valid sacrament of marriage." Weddings in which both parties are Catholic Christians are ordinarily held in a Catholic church, while weddings in which one party is a Catholic Christian and the other party is a non-Catholic Christian can be held in a Catholic church or a non-Catholic Christian church.

Islam  
The largest form of Inter-sect marriages in Islam is Sunni-Shia marriage. These marriages are common in Iraq, but uncommon in Saudi Arabia.

See also

 Ecumenism
 Endogamy
 Interfaith marriage
 Shia–Sunni relations

References

External links
Catholic Encyclopedia: Mixed Marriage
 

 
Christian ecumenism